The Business of Fancydancing is a 2002 film written and directed by Sherman Alexie. It is loosely based on his 1992 book of the same name, a collection of stories and poems.

Plot
The film explores the tension between two Spokane men who grew up together on the Spokane Reservation in eastern Washington state: Seymour Polatkin (Evan Adams) and Aristotle (Gene Tagaban). Seymour's internal conflict between his Indian heritage and his life as an urban gay man with a white boyfriend plays out in multiple cultures and relationships over his college and early adult years. His literary success as a famed American Indian poet, resulting in accolades from non-Indians, contrasts with a lack of approval from those he grew up with back on the reservation. The protagonist struggles with discomfort and alienation in both worlds.

Seymour returns to the reservation for the funeral of his friend Mouse (Swil Kanim), a violinist, and Seymour's internal conflict becomes external as his childhood friends and relatives on the reservation question his motivation for writing Indian-themed poems and selling them to the mainstream public.  The film examines several issues that contemporary American Indians face, including cultural assimilation (both on the reservation and in urban areas), difficult stereotypes, and substance abuse.

Cast 
 Evan Adams as Seymour Polatkin
 Michelle St. John as Agnes Roth
 Gene Tagaban as Aristotle Joseph
 Swil Kanim as Mouse
 Rebecca Carroll as The Interviewer
 Cynthia Geary as Teresa
 Leo Rossi as Mr. Williams
 Kevin Phillip as Steven
 Elaine Miles as Kim
 Arthur Tulee as Junior One
 Jim Boyd as Junior Two
 Jennifer Elizabeth Kreisberg (billed as Jennifer Kreisberg) as Salmon Girl 
 Ron Otis as White Motorist
 William Joseph Elk III as Tavern Father

Notes
There is also a book with the title The Business of Fancydancing: Stories and Poems (1992) which was well received, selling over 10,000 copies.

In the DVD commentary, Alexie refers to Michelle St. John's character, 'Agnes Roth', a mixed-race (Spokane/Jewish) woman who moves to the reservation to teach in the school, as "the moral center of the film". Agnes is also an ex-lover of Polatkin's, with the two of them still maintaining a deep friendship.

The film's incidental music was composed by Mohican composer Brent Michael Davids. The violin solos were composed and performed by Swil Kanim, and a number of the actors sing. The film also features Alexie's poetry, and the author's mother served as a language consultant.

The film was made in an experimental and largely non-hierarchical manner, with a predominantly female crew; many scenes were improvised, with biographical details from the lives of the actors as well as the writer/director. This is discussed in detail on the DVD commentary and the behind the scenes documentary included in the DVD release, where Alexie comments that he wanted to make a film that not only discussed his politics, but put them into practice in the making of the film.

See also
 Fancy dance
 List of American films of 2002
 Sherman Alexie
 Smoke Signals

References

External links

2002 drama films
2002 directorial debut films
2002 films
2002 LGBT-related films
American drama films
American LGBT-related films
Films about Native Americans
Gay-related films
Works by Sherman Alexie
LGBT-related drama films
2000s English-language films
2000s American films